The crowned nudibranch (Polycera capensis)  is a species of dorid nudibranch. It is a marine gastropod mollusc in the family Polyceridae.

Distribution
This species is found off the southern African coast from Luderitz in Namibia to Port Alfred in South Africa. It is found from the intertidal to 35 m. It has been reported from Australia.

Description
The crowned nudibranch is a smooth-bodied variably coloured nudibranch. The ground colour is white or grey and there are usually black, yellow or orange stripes longitudinally along the notum, though these can be absent. The head has six yellow projections. The gills and rhinophores are black, and may be spotted with yellow. Alongside the gills is a pair of yellow projections. The animal may reach 50 mm in total length. A study using DNA sequencing found that there were two species amongst specimens identified as P. capensis, one of which appears to be the Twin-crowned nudibranch of Gosliner, 1987.

Ecology
The crowned nudibranch feeds on bryozoans of the genus Bugula. Its egg ribbon is a wavy white collar.

References

Polyceridae
Gastropods described in 1824